Japan competed at the 2005 Asian Indoor Games held in Bangkok, Thailand from November 12, 2005, to November 19, 2005. Japan finished eighth with 6 gold medals, 2 silver medals, and 6 bronze medals.

Medal summary

Medal table

Medalists

References 

Asian Indoor Games
Japan
2005